Ruth E. Blake is an American geochemist and environmental scientist. She is a professor at Yale University in earth & planetary sciences, environmental studies, and chemical & environmental engineering. Blake's work focuses on marine biogeochemical processes, paleoclimate, astrobiology, and stable isotope geochemistry.

Education 
Ruth Blake completed a B.S. degree in geology from Wayne State University and a M.S degree in hydrogeology from the University of Texas. She earned a Ph.D. in geochemistry from University of Michigan in 1998. Blake's doctoral research focused on how microbial activity can affect oxygen isotopes in phosphates.

Career and research
While a professor at Yale, Blake expanded on her graduate research focus using isotopic evidence in ancient marine phosphates to show that there was significant biological activity in the ocean during the Archean era.

Blake has worked on numerous other research topics related to biological and/or chemical activity in oceans, sediments, and soils. She has worked on methods development in isotope geochemistry.

Awards and honors
Blake was the 2002 winner of the F. W. Clarke Award of the Geochemical Society.

References

External links
 

Yale University faculty
Living people
Year of birth missing (living people)
American geophysicists
Environmental scientists
Women geophysicists
21st-century American physicists
21st-century American women scientists
Wayne State University alumni
American women geologists
American women physicists
21st-century American geologists
University of Texas at Austin alumni
University of Michigan alumni
American women academics
21st-century African-American women
21st-century African-American scientists